Cervus astylodon, the Ryukyu dwarf deer, is a recently extinct species of cervid that was endemic to the Ryukyu islands (Okinawa, Ishigaki, Kume, Tokunoshima). It lived throughout the Pleistocene, going extinct as recently as 20,000 BP.

Taxonomy and evolution
It was described by Hikoshichiro Matsumoto in 1926 and originally classified as a species of muntjac.

Recently discovered Early Pleistocene remains assigned to C. astylodon show it to be much larger than the Late Pleistocene forms, showing this species went through a gradual dwarfing process. The ancestral C. astylodon may have arrived on the Ryukyu islands from northern China.

Description
It exhibits morphological characteristics that are considered typical of insular dwarf cervids, such as small body size, shortened limbs, and hypsodont molars.
The antlers were generally very small, flattened and strongly grooved, with brow-tines that branch off from the very base of the antlers.

The Ryukyu dwarf deer shows four distinct morphotypes based on each of the four islands it inhabits. In Kume, the metacarpal bones are more slender than other forms, while those from Ishigaki have a thicker, stouter shaft. The deer from Okinawa and Tokunoshima are intermediate in metacarpal thickness; both those forms show differences with each other in the shape of the proximal metacarpal canal.

Diet
The Ryukyu dwarf deer was originally thought to be a browser. Using mesowear analysis, its teeth were shown to have sharp cusps with high profiles, which implied a significant amount of browse in diets; deer with a more abrasive diet tend to have more rounded lower-profile cusps.

However, a 2021 study using dental microwear texture analysis indicated that the Ryukyu dwarf deer was a mixed-feeder or grazer instead. Deer with a higher consumption of graminoids show rougher tooth surfaces than those browsing on trees owing to the high content of abrasive silica in graminoid leaves. A comparison of C. astylodon from two different sites (Hananda-Gama Cave site and the Yamashita-cho Cave I site) show a different amount of wear, indicating a variable diet.

Extinction
The Ryukyu dwarf deer seemed to have gone extinct towards the end of the Pleistocene.
Early humans are first believed to have arrived on Okinawa as early as 36 ka, and evidence does exist that the deer was hunted by this population. However, the Ryukyu dwarf deer did survive alongside humans for over 15,000 years, so the shrinking of the Ryukyu islands due to rising sea levels towards the end of the last ice age may have contributed to their demise as well.

See also
Candiacervus - dwarf deer from Crete
Praemegaceros cazioti - dwarf deer from Sardinia

References

Prehistoric deer
Pleistocene even-toed ungulates
Prehistoric mammals of Asia
Pleistocene mammals of Asia
Pleistocene extinctions
Extinct animals of Japan